Anwar is a 2010 Indian action thriller film written and directed by Amal Neerad, starring Prithviraj Sukumaran in the titular role with Prakash Raj, Mamta Mohandas and Lal in supporting roles. The film was shot simultaneously in Malayalam and Tamil, and the film is also dubbed into Hindi as Diler Hindustani. The film's plot elements were inspired by the 2008 American film Traitor.

Plot 
The plot revolves around the Coimbatore bomb blast, where a special team under Stalin Manimaran, arrests Babu Sait, a local community leader as a suspect in the bomb blast case. One year later, Anwar, a Malayali youth is arrested while carrying with some hawala money, and is sent to prison with Babu Sait and his team. Anwar is fascinated by the terrorist activities of Babu Sait, who helps Anwar in getting bail and interests him in his activities. 

Anwar successfully terminates two local drug dealers and becomes the most trusted and obedient right hand of Babu Sait. Anwar succeeds in planting a bomb in the police headquarters and is soon introduced to Basheer Bhai, who selects him to spearhead another big, but dangerous project of chain blasts in Mumbai. Though Anwar goes on with their plans, Babu Sait shows the pictures of the Coimbatore blast, which diverts Anwar to his past. 

Past: Anwar is an NRI, who returns from USA for his sister Asna's wedding in a rural area of Palakkad where he meets and falls for Asna's best friend Aayisha, who later accepts his proposal. When Anwar and his family went for shopping to Coimbatore, a sudden blast occurs which kills his whole family, leaving Anwar as the sole survivor, but Aayisha is later arrested for the blast. Anwar requests Stalin for her bail, but the latter refuses due to lack of evidence. Later, Anwar begins to assist Stalin in the discovery of the terrorists and their nefarious activities and joins Babu Sait's gang in order to learn about their next attack. 

Present: Anwar reveals about the bomb blasts planned by Babu Sait to Stalin in their secret meeting, where Stalin also brings Aayisha so that they could meet after a long time. When Babu Sait's men arrive, Stalin tells Anwar to act as if they were having a fight, and one of the Babu Sait's men shoot Stalin, thereby killing him, thinking that Anwar was having a fight. Anwar is given the responsibility of transporting the deadly terrorists to Mumbai, through a ship containing full of explosives and weapons. At first, Anwar makes them think that he is on their side, but he soon blasts the ship and kills all the terrorists. 

Babu Sait becomes furious, that Anwar cheated them. When Anwar reveals about his parents, Babu Sait commits suicide. Anwar calls Stalin's phone, which is under police custody, and tells them that the mission is accomplished. Stalin & his colleague received bravery awards, but no one has recognised the near-death battle, which Anwar has played. Anwar and Aayisha are now, in a quiet place, living together in a small house.

Cast

 Prithviraj Sukumaran as Anwar Ahmed
 Prakash Raj as Stalin Manimaran
 Mamta Mohandas as Ayesha Begum
 Lal as Babu Sait
 Assim Jamal as Saleem
 Sampath Raj as Basheer Bhai
 Jinu Joseph as ACP Sathyanarayanan IPS
 Sudheer Karamana as Shaji
 Sai Kumar as Ahmed Haji, Anwar's father
 Geetha as Rasiya Begum, Anwar's mother
 Nithya Menen as Asna Begum
 Salim Kumar as Ashraf
 Sreejith Ravi as Ottappalam Rasheed
 Sasi Kalinga as Moideen
 Rajeev Pillai as a Terrorist Sulaiman
 Vinay Forrt as Abu
 Mahanadi Shankar
 Shane Nigam as a boy at STD booth

Production 

Shoot for the film started in March, 2010. The main location was Kochi.

Awards 
 Filmfare Awards
 won
 Best Music Director – Gopi Sundar
 Best Female Playback Singer – Shreya Ghoshal – "Kizhakk Pookkum"
 Best Lyricist – Rafeeque Ahmed – "Kizhakku Pookkum"
 Nominated
 Best Actor – Prithviraj Sukumaran
 Best Negative role – Lal

Soundtrack 

The soundtrack of the film, composed by Gopi Sundar, was released on 3 September 2010. The album features seven songs with lyrics by Rafeeq Ahmed, with 7 songs in Malayalam version and 5 songs in Tamil version of the film.

In the 2011 Vanitha Film Awards, the song Kizhakku Pookkum won three awards: Best Song, Best Female Playback (Shreya Ghoshal) and Best Lyrics (Rafeeq Ahamed).

Malayalam Version

References

External links 
 
 

Indian action thriller films
2010 action thriller films
2010 films
2010s Malayalam-language films
Films about organised crime in India
Films about terrorism in India
2010s spy thriller films
Indian spy thriller films
Films scored by Gopi Sundar
Films directed by Amal Neerad